Washington County Schools could refer to:

 Washington County USD 108 in Kansas
 Washington County Schools (Kentucky)
 Washington County Public Schools in Maryland
 Washington County Schools (North Carolina)
 Washington County Schools (Tennessee)